Dudley O'Shaughnessy (born 17 October 1989) is an English ABA welterweight boxing champion, actor, and model.

Career
O'Shaughnessy (also known as Lil Saint) was an amateur boxer from the age of 9, after being introduced to the sport by his father, who himself was a former boxer. O'Shaughnessy lost a fight to Northern Irish boxer Matthew Johnston, who trained with the Abbey Boxing Club. He became the British amateur welterweight champion in 2010, after being the runner-up in 2009. However, he was still overlooked by the British Olympic association.

At the age of 19, he was scouted by a local modelling agency, and then moved to NEXT Model Management. He then began to focus on modelling.

In 2011, he was chosen to star in the music video for "We Found Love" by Rihanna. Since then his profile has risen in popularity. O'Shaughnessy has featured in some of the works by Oswald Boateng, Fred Perry and Stone Island (where he featured in a short film portraying his aspiration to be an Olympic boxer). He appeared on the cover of fashion magazines as well as featuring in the editorial by Bullett Magazine, alongside Vogue cover girl Valerie van der Graaf.

In 2012, he appeared on the runway for designers such as Jeremy Scott fall 2012 New York, Timo Welliand's 2012 fall ready to wear collection and has walked for Michael Michalsky at the Berlin fashion week.

O'Shaughnessy was awarded the 2012 Male Model of the year by ARISE magazine.

In January 2013, O'Shaughnessy was cast in the UK's United Colors of Benetton ad campaign. In 2014, O'Shaughnessy appeared in an episode of the detective drama Suspects, playing "Wakim Ahmed". In 2016, O'Shaughnessy had his first feature as a lead role in Joseph A Adesunloye's White Colour Black. The film was nominated at BFI London Film Festival Nominated: BFI IWC Schaffhausen Filmmakers Bursary Award 2016, Longlisted at BIFA Awards in 2017 for Best Screenplay & Best Newcomer, Baltimore International Black Film Festival 2017, Winner for Best International Feature, and Best Narrative Feature & Oscar Micheaux Award for directing. In 2019, O’Shaughnessy featured with Ashley Walters in Top Boy.

Personal life
O'Shaughnessy was born in East London to a Saint Lucian father with Afro-Caribbean and Irish heritage and an English mother. He attended school at Brampton Manor Academy in East Ham. He was also rumoured to be in a relationship with Rihanna after recording the video "We Found Love" but Rihanna stated on The Ellen DeGeneres Show that she was single at the time.

References

External links
O'Shaughnessy profile, Models.com. Retrieved 7 September 2015.
O'Shaughnessy profile, nextmodels.com. Retrieved 7 September 2015.
Stone Island Clip, style.com. Retrieved 7 September 2015.
Profile, vogue.co.uk; 1 November 2011.

1989 births
Living people
21st-century English male actors
Black British male actors
Black British sportspeople
Boxers from Greater London
English male boxers
English male models
English male television actors
English people of Irish descent
English people of Saint Lucian descent
Male actors from London
Models from London
Select Model Management models